Maj Britt Andersen (born 15 November 1956) is a Norwegian singer.

Biography 
She was born in Østre Toten and is a sister of Inger Lise Rypdal. Her album Folk er rare from 1986 earned her Spellemannprisen. She was singing in the soul group Chipahua in the 1980s. She has also issued albums with texts by Alf Prøysen (Kjærtegn from 1992 and Dørstokken heme from 2004).

Andersen has also been a member of Asker municipal council for one term, representing a local party.

Since 1983 she has been married to the bassist and music producer Geir Holmsen.

Honors 
2015: Spellemannprisen in the Children's Music category, for the album Væla Omkring

Discography

Solo albums 
1975: Et Lite Under (Nett Records)
1978: Det Svinger I Meg (CBS Records)
1986: Folk Er Rare! (Barneselskapet)
1987: Tida Går Så Altfor Fort (Barneselskapet)
1987: Folk Er Rare! 2! (Slager Records)
1990: Tamme Erter Og Villbringebær (Norsk Plateproduksjon AS)
1992: Kjærtegn (Norsk Plateproduksjon AS)
1994: Rippel Rappel (Grappa Music)
1997: Vinterkropp (Grappa Music)
1998: Chevina  (Grappa Music)
2006: Onger Er Rare (MajorStudio AS)
2010: Indranis Sang (Barnemusikken)
2015: Væla Omkring (Grappa Music)
2017: Pulverheksas og vennene hennes
2018: Et stille sted

References

External links 
Website

1956 births
Living people
People from Østre Toten
20th-century Norwegian women singers
20th-century Norwegian singers
21st-century Norwegian women singers
21st-century Norwegian singers
Asker politicians
Spellemannprisen winners